Face Down may refer to:

Music
 Face Down (band), a Swedish post-thrash/death metal band
 Facedown Records, a Christian record label based in California

Albums
 Face Down (album), a 1999 album by Serial Joe
 Facedown (album), a 2004 album by Matt Redman
 Facedown (EP), a 2012 extended play by The 1975

Songs
 "Face Down", a 1980 song by Wild Horses
 "Face Down" (The Red Jumpsuit Apparatus song), 2006
 "Face Down" (Arashi song), 2012
 "Face Down", a song by American rapper Meek Mill
 "Face Down", a song by Killer Be Killed from Killer Be Killed
 "Face Down", a song by Prince from Emancipation

Others
 Face Down (film), a 2015 film